George William Shield (24 March 1876 – 1 December 1935) was a British Labour Party politician.

Born in Coanwood in Northumberland, Shield became a coal miner before winning election as a checkweighman.  A supporter of the Labour Party, he was elected to Northumberland County Council, and also served as a magistrate.

At the 1922 election, he stood unsuccessfully in the Conservative-held Hexham constituency in Northumberland, coming third with 24% of the votes.

Shield did not stand again until 1929, when he was elected as Member of Parliament for the Wansbeck constituency at a by-election on 13th February, and returned at the 1929 election.

He was defeated at the 1931 election by the Conservative candidate Bernard Cruddas, and did not stand again.

References 

 

1876 births
1935 deaths
Labour Party (UK) MPs for English constituencies
Miners' Federation of Great Britain-sponsored MPs
UK MPs 1924–1929
UK MPs 1929–1931